Kyungsung Football Club was the Korean football club based in the city of Seoul.
The term Kyungsung or Gyeongseong was used instead of Seoul during the period of Japanese rule. After independence from Japan, the club revived and changed the name to Seoul FC in 1946. Due to the North Korean invasion, the club stopped operating.

When Korea was under Japanese rule, Kyungsung FC participated in Japanese Emperor's Cup and won the prize, becoming the only non-Japanese home islands club to win it.

History 
Kyungsung FC was founded in 1933 and Kyungsung FC is a historic club of Korean football.

Honours 
 All Joseon Football Tournament
   Winner (2) : 1936
   Runners-up (3) : 1933, 1938, 1939
 Emperor's Cup
   Winner (1) : 1935
 Meiji Shrine Games
   Winner (1) : 1935 Football at the Meiji Shrine Games

Rivalry 
Rival was Pyongyang FC. Rival match was famous and called Kyung-Pyong Football Match

See also 
 Football in Seoul
 Pyongyang FC
 Kyungsung FC–Pyongyang FC rivalry
 Kim Yong-sik

References 

 전조선축구대회 역대 결과-대한축구협회 웹사이트

 
Association football clubs established in 1933
Association football clubs disestablished in 1953
Football clubs in Seoul
Defunct football clubs in South Korea
Emperor's Cup winners
1933 establishments in Korea
1953 disestablishments in South Korea